Whitstone was an ancient hundred of Gloucestershire, England.  From the 13th century it comprised two adjacent divisions, which included the ancient parishes of:
Lower Division
Eastington
Frampton-on-Severn 
Frocester
King's Stanley 
Leonard Stanley
Stonehouse
Wheatenhurst (now Whitminster)
Upper Division
Fretherne
Hardwicke
Haresfield
Longney
Moreton Valence
Randwick
Saul
Standish
Quedgeley (part)

The hundred existed at the time of the Domesday Book in 1086, but covering a smaller area.  By 1220 the adjacent Blacklow hundred had been absorbed. Blachelaue in the Domesday Book contained the parishes of Alkerton (now Eastington), Frampton (-on-Severn), Frocester, (Kings) Stanley, (Leonard) Stanley, Stonehouse, Wheatenhurst, and Fretherne.

The ancient meeting place of the hundred was probably at Whitestones Field in the parish of Hardwicke, although meetings were later held at Quedgeley, Stonehouse, Wheatenhurst and Frampton.

References

External links 
The National Gazetteer of Great Britain and Ireland (1868)

Hundreds of Gloucestershire